The Saturn Award for Best Science Fiction Television Series is one of the annual awards given by the American Academy of Science Fiction, Fantasy & Horror Films. The Saturn Awards, which are the oldest film and series-specialized awards to reward science fiction, fantasy, and horror achievements, included the category for the first time at the 42nd Saturn Awards ceremony, when the Saturn Award went through major changes in their television categories. It specifically rewards science fiction on television. As of the 47th Saturn Awards, the category was split to recognize both network/cable series and streaming series.

Winners and nominees 
The winners are listed in bold.

(NOTE: Year refers to year of eligibility, the actual ceremonies are held the following year)

2010s

2020s

Most nominations 
 4 nominations – Doctor Who, The Expanse, The 100, Westworld
 3 nominations – Colony, The Orville
 2 nominations – Lost in Space, Star Trek: Discovery, The X-Files

Most wins 
 2 wins – Westworld

See also
 Saturn Award for Best Network Television Series
 Saturn Award for Best Syndicated/Cable Television Series
 Saturn Award for Best Youth-Oriented Television Series
 Saturn Award for Best Streaming Science Fiction, Action & Fantasy Series

External links
 Official site

Saturn Awards